Upanga East is an administrative ward in the Ilala District of the Dar es Salaam Region of Tanzania. According to the 2002 census, the ward has a total population of 7,385.

Embassies in Upanga East
Upanga East hosts the following embassies;

 Embassy of The Democratic Republic of Congo
 Embassy of The Italian Republic  
 Embassy of The Republic of Burundi
 Embassy of The Republic of Sudan
 Embassy of The State of Japan

Amenities and Organisations located in Upanga East

Upanga East also hosts the following;

 The Aga Khan Diamond Jubilee Hall
 The Tanzania Scouts Association Ground
 The Shabaan Robert Secondary School
 The Aga Khan Primary School
 The Don Bosco Youth Centre
 The Tanzania Telecommunication Company Limited
 The Aga Khan Hospital

References

Ilala District
Wards of Dar es Salaam Region